Aliotta is a surname. Notable people with the surname include:

Antonio Aliotta (1881–1964), Italian philosopher
Marialuisa Aliotta, Italian astrophysicist
Mitch Aliotta (1944–2015), American vocalist and bassist

See also
Aliotti